Clear Lake National Wildlife Refuge is a National Wildlife Refuge of the United States in northeastern California.

The uplands are inhabited by pronghorn, mule deer, and sage grouse. The Clear Lake Reservoir is the primary source of water for the croplands of the eastern Klamath Basin, with water levels regulated by the Bureau of Reclamation.

Except for limited pronghorn and waterfowl hunting during the state hunting seasons, the refuge is closed to all public access for the protection of habitat and wildlife.

References

External links

Profile: Clear Lake National Wildlife Refuge. USFWS.
Home Page: Clear Lake National Wildlife Refuge. USFWS.

Protected areas of Modoc County, California
National Wildlife Refuges in California
Wetlands of California
Landforms of Modoc County, California